Yitzhak Shapira is an Israeli rabbi who lived in the West Bank Israeli settlement Yitzhar, and is head of the Od Yosef Chai Yeshiva.

In 2009, he published a book (The King's Torah) in which he writes that it is permissible for Jews to kill non-Jews (including children). The book states "There is a reason to kill babies [on the enemy side] even if they have not transgressed the seven Noahide Laws because of the future danger they may present, since it is assumed that they will grow up to be evil like their parents." They can be killed indirectly to put pressure on enemy leaders, or if they are "in the way". They can also be harmed if they "prevent a rescue, because their presence contributes to murder". He also writes that children of the king can be harmed to pressure him if he is wicked and harming them will prevent him from acting wickedly. He adds that "it is better to kill one pursuing another to murder him, than to kill others." The book was distributed by Yeshivat HaRaayon HaYehudi in Jerusalem, which adheres to the ideas of the late Rabbi Meir Kahane.

Yehuda Bauer described the book as a "mortal danger to the Jewish people as a whole". Ophir Pines-Paz, a member of the Israeli Knesset at the time, called on the attorney general to open a criminal investigation against Shapira on account of the book.

Shapira was detained for questioning in 2006 over an article that advocated expelling or killing all male Palestinians above the age of 13 in the West Bank. In 2008 he signed a "manifesto" in support of Israelis suspected of beating two Arab youths during that year's Holocaust Remembrance Day. In January 2010, he was arrested for his "alleged involvement in the torching of a Palestinian mosque in the village of Yasuf." He denied any involvement, and was released due to lack of evidence.

In October 2010, he urged Israel Defense Forces soldiers to use Palestinian civilians as human shields, claiming that it was against "true Jewish values" for a soldier to endanger his life for the sake of enemy soldiers or civilians.

References

1966 births
Israeli rabbis
Israeli Kahanists
Israeli settlers
Living people
Infanticide
People from Ofra
Israeli Rosh yeshivas